Albert Norton (1 January 1836 – 11 March 1914) was a Queensland politician, Speaker of the Queensland Legislative Assembly and pastoralist.

Early life 
Norton was the sixth son of James Norton, born at the family home, "Elswick" now Leichhardt, New South Wales. He was educated at the Rev. F. Wilkinson's school at Sydney, and from 1852 to 1857 was gaining experience on stations in the New England district of New South Wales. During the next three years he had a wandering life in New South Wales and Victoria, but in 1860 bought the Rodd's Bay station in the Port Curtis District, Queensland. He specialised in cattle, and in spite of some bad experiences with drought and disease, became a successful pastoralist.

Politics 
In 1866 he stood for the Port Curtis seat in the Legislative Assembly but was defeated, and in the following year was nominated to the Legislative Council. He resigned his seat in 1868 and did not attempt to enter politics again until in 1878, having previously retired from his station, he was elected unopposed for Port Curtis. In March 1883, on the resignation of John Murtagh Macrossan, Norton accepted office as Minister for Works and Mines in the First McIlwraith Ministry. In 1888 Norton was unanimously elected speaker of the legislative assembly. He lost his seat at the 1893 election, and in 1894 was nominated as a member of the Legislative Council, a lifetime appointment. Norton was chairman of committee from 1902 to 1907 and continued to be an active member of the house until a few months before his death. 

Norton had been much interested in the welfare of the mining industry, he encouraged the giving of lectures in mineralogy, and was primarily responsible for the establishment of the school of mines. He was a trustee of the Royal Society of Queensland, and contributed about a dozen papers to its Proceedings. His political speeches were always carefully prepared but the effect was to some extent spoiled by a monotonous delivery.

Later life 
Norton died on 11 March 1914 at Milton in Brisbane.

References

External links
Norton Albert — Brisbane City Council Grave Location Search

1836 births
1914 deaths
Members of the Queensland Legislative Council
Members of the Queensland Legislative Assembly
Burials at Toowong Cemetery
Speakers of the Queensland Legislative Assembly
Royal Society of Queensland